Dr. Samuel (Shmuel Yaakov) Soloveichik (1909 – February 25, 1967) was an Orthodox Jewish chemist and talmudist.

Early life 

Born in Pruzhany, Samuel Soloveichik was the second son of Rabbi Moshe Soloveichik. He was the brother of rabbis Joseph Soloveitchik (1903-1993) and Ahron Soloveichik (1917-2001). He had two sisters, Mrs. Shulamith Meiselman (1912-2009), and Mrs. Anne Gerber (1915-2011).

After engaging in talmudic studies with his father, Soloveichik studied mathematics and science.
In 1934 he received a doctorate in chemistry from the University of Brussels, graduating magnum cum laude. In 1939 he emigrated to the United States. During the Second World War Soloveichik worked as a research chemist for the Board of Chemical Warfare and the Board of Economic Warfare.

Career 

In 1950, he received a Research Fellowship at Yeshiva University becoming Lecturer in Chemistry in the University's Chemistry Department in 1953. From 1959 until his death he was Associate Professor of Chemistry. He was also a member of the American Chemical Society and the American Association for the Advancement of Science.

In a paper published in 1966, Soloveichik proposed a means of classifying aliphatic compounds similar to the periodic table. Prior to publishing the paper he discussed its contents with the chemist Linus Pauling in August–September 1955.

Soloveichik was an expert and frequently lectured and wrote in the field of the History of Chemistry. In a series of  papers he attributed the premature deaths or illnesses of the chemists Joseph Priestley, Carl Wilhelm Scheele, Humphry Davy, William Cruickshank (chemist) and James Woodhouse to chemical poisoning.

In lectures at Yeshiva University Soloveichik discussed the relationship between science and Torah with regard to issues such as the age of the earth and whether the earth orbits the sun or vice versa.

Death 

Soloveichik died aged 58 on February 25, 1967, at Montefiore Hospital in the Bronx, New York. He was survived by his wife Bathsheba Ziv, a teacher at the Beis Yaakov-Beis Miriam High School in the Bronx, and his four siblings. His older brother Joseph Ber delivered a brief eulogy at his funeral, as did Yeshiva University President, Dr. Samuel Belkin. The main eulogy, lasting close to two hours, was delivered by his younger brother, Ahron.

The Dr. Samuel Soloveichik Prize in Natural Science was established at Yeshiva University in his memory.

Brisker Family Tree

Articles
 "The Last Fight for Phlogiston and the Death of Priestley," J. Chem. Educ. 39 (1962), pp. 644–646
 "Hidden Danger In the Lab", Chem. Eng. News, 41(37), (1963), p. 178
 "Toxicity: Killer of great chemists?," J. Chem. Educ., 41 (5),(1964), p. 282
 and Henry Krakauer "Oxidation stages of organic aliphatic compounds: A classification scheme"  J. Chem. Educ. 43 (10) 1966, p. 532
 and Henry Krakauer, "Alfred Werner," in Werner Centennial: A Symposium, ed. George B. Kauffman (Washington, D.C.: American Chemical Society), pp. 3–7

Patents
 'Method for Preparing Formic Esters', (US Patent 2617821, November 11, 1952)
 'Process for the Production of Nitrous Esters' (Serial No. 438,325, August 2, 1955)

References
 http://archive.jta.org/article/1967/02/28/2748407/dr-samuel-soloveichik-yochiva-university-professor-dead-was-58

1909 births
1967 deaths
American Orthodox Jews
Jewish chemists
Historians of science
Yeshiva University faculty
People from Pruzhany
Belarusian Jews
20th-century American historians